The Myth of Pelagianism (2018) is a book by Ali Bonner which asserts that the Christian heresy known as Pelagianism was a "deliberately invented fiction" of its opponent Augustine, rather than an actual doctrine promoted by Pelagius. Bonner also asserts that Pelagius'  actual positions were orthodox in contemporary Christianity of his time. The book is based on Bonner's doctoral and postdoctoral research and was published by Oxford University Press. It received mixed reviews; some reviewers were not convinced by Bonner's arguments.

References

Books about ancient Christianity
2018 non-fiction books
Oxford University Press books
Christian theology books
Augustine studies
Pelagianism